The Walls of Grosseto, known also as Medicean Walls, are a series of defensive brick walls surrounding the city of Grosseto in southern Tuscany, Italy.

The fortifications were commissioned by Cosimo I de' Medici, after the conquest of the Republic of Siena and its annexation to the Grand Duchy of Tuscany. The walls were designed by engineer-architect Baldassarre Lanci in 1564. Construction began in 1565 and was completed in 1593.

During the 19th century, under the rule of Leopold II, the walkways of the walls were demilitarized and transformed into gardens and promenades.

Fortifications
Bastions, or bulwarks
Bastione Rimembranza (Remembrance)
Bastione Fortezza (Fortress) – it incorporates the ancient 14th century Sienese fortress
Bastione Maiano
Bastione Cavallerizza (Equestrian)
Bastione Molino a Vento (Windmill)
Bastione Garibaldi

City gates
Porta Nuova (New Gate)
Porta Vecchia (Old Gate) – 14th-century gate, surviving the demolition of the ancient Sienese walls
Porta Corsica

Bibliography

See also
Bastion fort
House of Medici

External links

Grosseto
Grosseto
Buildings and structures in Grosseto
Fortifications in Italy
Tourist attractions in Tuscany